The Treaty of Newcastle was a treaty signed between King Edward III of England and King Edward Balliol of Scotland on 12 June 1334.

By the terms of the treaty, Balliol pledged the overlordship of England, the surrender of Berwick, and to cede the whole of south-eastern Scotland (Berwickshire, Roxburghshire, Selkirkshire, Peebleshire, Dumfrieshire, East Lothian, Mid Lothian and West Lothian) to England.

Citations

Newcastle
14th century in England
1334 in Scotland
1334 in England
Treaties of medieval England
Treaties of Scotland
England–Scotland relations
History of Newcastle upon Tyne
1330s treaties